Aira Laila Suvio-Samulin (née Suvio, born 27 February 1927) is a Finnish dance teacher and entrepreneur.

Life and career
Samulin was born 27 February 1927 in Ignoila, Salmi, Finland (present-day Russia). The village was part of the municipality of Salmi, until it was annexed to Suojärvi in 1931. Ignoila was the easternmost of the villages in the so-called "Hyrsylä curve".

Samulin's father was killed in action as a troop leader in the Continuation War on 27 July 1941. Samulin's uncle Sten Suvio was an Olympic-winning boxer.

In 1954 Samulin was chosen as a mannequin queen.

Samulin has been the director of her own dance school and worked as a filming secretary at Suomen Filmiteollisuus. In the 1960s Samulin founded a fashion dance school called Rytmikkäät mannekiinit.

From 1989 to 1996 Samulin was a member of the city council of Espoo representing the Centre Party. From 1997 she was a member of the City Council of Helsinki representing the National Coalition Party. Since 2001 she has been a deputy member of the city council of Helsinki. She is a member of the Helsinki Week foundation and of the board of the environment, as well as a deputy member of the Helsinki theatre foundation.

In 2001 a film of Samulin's life called Tango Kabaree was made, with Samulin playing herself. She also played herself in the film Uuno Turhapuro – This Is My Life and one episode of the TV show Fakta homma.

Samulin has a Karelian-style house called "Hyrsylän mutka" in the village of Hyrsylä, Nummi, Lohja, which is a local sight. The house was named after the village of Hyrsylä in the Republic of Karelia, which was ceded to Russia after the Continuation War.

Awards and recognition
Samulin has been awarded the Order of the Lion of Finland knight award, the Mental Health Award of Mieli ry for her artwork Auringonpimennys ("solar eclipse") about family violence and mental health disturbances and an Entertainment work award. She has been especially active in youth activities.

In 2011 the Regional Organisation of Enterprises in Helsinki awarded its first life's work award to Samulin.

In 2017 the Finnish central chamber of commerce awarded Samulin for her life's work in the fashin industry.

In 2019 Reserviratsastajat ry awarded Samulin a golden rider's medal for her work for the riding tradition and defense of the country.

Family
Samulin has a daughter Pirjo (1947–2018) and a son Jari Samulin (born 1955) from her marriage to Helge Samulin, which ended in a separation in 1963. Aira Samulin had a short relationship with fashion designer Timo Sarpaneva and also a relationship with sports commentator Paavo Noponen from 1965 to 1972. Samulin was married to Erkku Peltomäki from 1973 to 2004.

Bibliography
Soturi ja sunnuntailapsi. Edited by Sirkka-Liisa Lähteenoja. Helsinki: WSOY, 1987. .
Auringonpimennys. Edited by Sirkka-Liisa Lähteenoja. Helsinki: WSOY, 1989. . 2nd edition 1999, common book Soturi ja sunnuntailapsi; Auringonpimennys. Helsinki: WSOY, 2007. .
Uskomaton Aira Samulin. Edited by Sauli Miettinen. Helsinki: WSOY, 2016. .

References

External links
 Official site
 Aira Samulin at the Internet Movie Database
 Forsman, Carita: 82 faktaa Aira Samulinista, Kaleva 23 April 2009.

Finnish female dancers
Centre Party (Finland) politicians
National Coalition Party politicians
1927 births
Living people